Theodor Bartus (January 30, 1858 in Lassan, Germany - January 28, 1941 in Berlin) was a German sailor, museum technician, and conservator. Bartus was the son of a master weaver. He began his nautical career on the sailing ship of his uncle. In Australia, he passed his First mate exam and became captain. He acquired many years of experience sailing ships. At times, he lived as a squatter in Australia.

During a visit to Germany, his Australian bank went bankrupt, and he became suddenly destitute. Forced to find a job, he worked from 1888 as a museum technician at the Ethnological Museum of Berlin, where he rigged vessels.

Between 1902 and 1914, he was a technical crew member on all four German Turfan expeditions headed by Albert Grünwedel and Albert von Le Coq. Bartus developed a method of detaching mural paintings and inscriptions from caves, rock walls, and ruins, leaving them largely undamaged, which were then transported to Germany. Until his death, he was employed at the museum, preparing and preserving the finds he brought back from Turfan.

References
 Bartus, Theodor. "Grete Grewolls: Wer war wer in Mecklenburg-Vorpommern?" In Personenlexikon. Edition Temmen, Bremen 1995, S. 32. (German language)
 Knüppel, Michael: "Theodor Bartus (1858–1941) – Anmerkungen zu seinem siebzigsten Todestag". In: Pommern. Zeitschrift für Kultur und Geschichte. Heft 4/2010, S. 14–18. (German language)

Notes

1858 births
1941 deaths
People from Vorpommern-Greifswald
People from the Province of Pomerania
German explorers